Jang Bo-go (787–841), whose childhood name was Gungbok or Gungpa (궁파), was a Sillan who rose to prominence in the Later Silla period of Korea as a powerful maritime figure who effectively controlled the Yellow Sea (West Sea), and dominated the trade between Silla, Heian Japan, and Tang China for decades. His impressive fleet of ships was centered in Wando, an island in South Jeolla Province. So influential a figure did Jang become in late Silla politics that he was granted official office as maritime commissioner of the Cheonghaejin Garrison (on Wando) and came near to marrying his daughter into the Silla Royal House before his assassination in 841. He was worshipped as a god following his death.

Early years 
Jang Bogo was born as the son of a boatman and his childhood name was Gungbok. Gungbok means a good bow shooter, and he excelled in martial arts and swam well since he was young. Gungbok, a native of Cheonmin, learned that he could not become a general in Silla, so he moved to Tang Dynasty and joined the army and changed his name to Jang Bogo. Meanwhile, Jang Bogo, who learned that the Silla people were suffering from pirates, eventually returned to Silla.

The three sources on his life are the Chinese New Book of Tang (Xīn Tángshū), the Japanese Shoku Nihon Kōki (続日本後紀), and the Korean 12th-century Samguk Sagi ("A History of the Three Kingdoms"), which contains a brief biography of Jang compiled three centuries after his death. The biography relates that Jang Bogo was adept in martial arts and claims that Jang's companion Jeong Yeon (정년, 鄭年) could swim five li (about 2.5 km) underwater, without taking a breath.  The history further records that as young men the two companions, Jang Bogo and Jeong Yeon, traveled to Tang China. Their skills in horsemanship and the handling of spears soon won them military office. They were both named Junior Generals of Wuning District (武寧軍小將) (in what is today Jiangsu province).

Rise to power 
By the ninth century thousands of Silla subjects were living in Tang, centered mostly around merchant activities in coastal Shandong and Jiangsu provinces, where they established their own Silla communities often led by Silla officials. Wealthy benefactors (including at one point Jang Bogo himself) even established Silla Buddhist temples in the region, as related by the 9th-century Japanese monk Ennin, whose journal constitutes one of the rare sources on Jang Bogo.

Apparently, while in China Jang Bogo had become incensed at the treatment of his fellow countrymen, who in the unstable milieu of late Tang often fell victim to coastal pirates or inland bandits. In fact, Silla subjects living in Tang had become a favored target of bandits, who sold their captives into slavery. In 823 the Tang emperor went so far as to issue an edict stopping the slave trade and ordering the return of all abducted Koreans to Silla. Shortly after returning to Silla around 825, and by now in possession of a formidable private fleet headquartered at Cheonghae (Wando), Jang Bogo petitioned the Silla king Heungdeok (r. 826-836) to establish a permanent maritime garrison to protect Silla merchant activities in the Yellow Sea. Heungdeok agreed and in 828 formally established the Cheonghae (淸海, "clear sea") Garrison at what is today Wando island off Korea's South Jeolla province. The Samguk Sagi further relates that Heungdeok gave Jang an army of 10,000 men to establish and man the defensive works. The remnants of Cheonghae Garrison can still be seen on Jang islet just off Wando's southern coast.

The establishment of Cheonghae garrison marked the apex of Jang's career. From that moment he can be viewed in the context of the numerous private warlords arising outside the Silla capital who were often backed by formidable private armies. Jang's force, though nominally bequeathed by the Silla king, was effectively under his own control. Jang became arbiter of Yellow Sea commerce and navigation. Another rare account of Jang and his garrison comes from the journal of the Japanese monk Ennin (Jikaku), who in 840 made a pilgrimage to Tang in search of Buddhist scriptures and relied upon the maritime abilities of Jang to reach China and return. The best evidence of Jang's now high fortunes is his involvement in the volatile factional politics of the Silla court.

Political influence 
At the time, Jang Bogo's backing by his own army allotted him immense power in politics. Militarily, he was powerful enough to overthrow the state and become king himself had he wanted to. He was often hated by the Silla royal family members due to his prominent status and the fact that he was born a commoner, not a nobleman.

In 839 Jang proved instrumental in the seizure of power by Silla's King Sinmu following the overthrow of King Minae. Kim Ujing (later King Sinmu) approached Jang for help in taking the throne from the usurper who had killed Ujing's father. Jang is purported to have replied, “The ancients had a saying, ‘To see what is right and not to do it is want of courage.’ Though I am without ability, I shall follow your orders." Thereupon Jang dispatched a force of 5000 men under the command of his closest companion and adviser Jeong Yeon (who had since also returned from Tang) in support of Sinmu's claim. The success of Sinmu's power grab won Jang Bogo the post of Prime Minister.

Death 
The account of Jang Bogo's demise comes from the Samguk Sagi. In 845 Jang overplayed his hand when he maneuvered to marry his daughter to King Munseong (ruled 839-857), son of Sinmu. Aristocratic factions at court, no doubt fed up with the machinations of Jang (a man in all likelihood from obscure provincial origins outside Silla's aristocratic order), then plotted to have him killed. The Samguk Yusa, a late 13th century Korean book that mixes history and tales of marvels and popular legend, relates that the Silla king was pressured by aristocrats to deny Jang his marriage and that as a result Jang began to conspire against the king. Whether it was the Silla king or the aristocracy that was behind Jang's demise is unclear. However, both the Samguk Sagi and Samguk Yusa relate that in 841 Jang was assassinated at his Cheonghae garrison headquarters by Yeomjang (염장, 閻長), an emissary from the Silla court who had arrived concealing a knife in his garments. Gaining Jang's confidence by pretending he had fled from the Silla capital, he then attacked Jang as they shared wine. However, the Japanese history book, Shoku Nihon Kōki (續日本後紀) (Later Chronicle of Japan, Continued), gives Jang's date of death as 841.

In 851 the Cheonghae garrison was disbanded and its troops dispersed. The location of Jang Bogo's burial spot remains unknown.

Family 
 Father - Jang Baek-ik (장백익, 張伯翼)
 Wife - Lady Park (박씨, 朴氏)
 Issue 
 Daughter - Jang Ui-jeong (장의영, 張義英)
 Daughter - Jang Hye-yeong (장혜영, 張惠英)
 Son-in-law - Kim Seong-hae (김성해, 金成海) of the Gimhae Kim clan
 Grandson - Kim Jeong-cheol (김정철, 金挺喆)

In Korean shamanism and mythology
Jang Bogo was worshipped as a god after his death, especially on the small island of Jangdo. The shamanistic temple on the island worships 'Great General Song'; however, according to the islanders, 'Great General Song' is a title of Jang Bogo.

There is a myth about Jang Bogo ('General Jang') and 'General Eom', Jang Bogo's son-in-law, retold in the region.

General Eom, who was General Jang's son-in-law, lived in the Eomnamut Valley. One day, he and General Jang had a contest; who could first raise a flag on that eastern crag? Jang Bogo transformed into a male pheasant and flew to the crag, but General Eom turned into a falcon and killed and ate General Jang in the form of a pheasant. Thus, the crag is still called Kattturiyeo (male pheasant crag).

Jang Bo-go Memorial Hall 
Jang Bo-go Memorial Hall, which is a 2F reinforced concrete structure with a plottage of 14,472m², a building area of 1,739m², and an exhibition space of 730m², has on its ground floor Central Hall, Video Room, Special Exhibition Hall, storage, and lounge and on its second floor its permanent exhibition venues of Exhibition Hall 1, Sea Route, and Exhibition Hall 2.

Central Hall on 1F displays ‘Trade Ships of Jang BoGo’, which was made to one fourth of the actual size by Director Ma Gwang-nam of Cheonghaejin Ship Institute and donated by Sea King Jang BoGo Memorial Society, and a large wooden mural(8m x 2.2m) entitled ‘Sea King Jang BoGo’, which was created with linden tree by Lu Guangzheng, the Chinese craft art maestro.

The permanent exhibition hall on 2F is divided into the four themes of ‘Root’, ’Formation of Cheonghaejin’, ‘Maritime Empire’, and ‘Voyage’, which respectively display relevant exhibits.

Visiting hours 
 Winter Season 09:00 a.m ~ 06.00 p.m
 Summer Season 09:00 a.m ~ 07.00 p.m

Cultural references 
 Jang Bogo and his exploits were the subject of the 1965 South Korean film, Jang Bogo, directed by Ahn Hyeon-cheol and starring Shin Yeong-gyun and Lee Min-ja. Its English title is Admiral Jang.
 The South Korean navy named the first of its Type 209 submarines 'Admiral Chang Bogo' in Jang's honor.
 A highly fictionalized account of Jang's life was the subject of the 2004 Korean drama Emperor of the Sea, starring Choi Soo-jong as Jang Bogo.
 In March 2009, the Cheonghae Anti-piracy Unit was formed by the Republic of Korea Navy to combat piracy off the coast of Somalia. The unit is named after Cheonghaejin, the maritime base created by Jang Bogo to combat piracy on the waters of Silla and Tang.
 In Shenyang, a memorial dedicated to Jang Bogo opened in 2007.

In popular culture 
 Portrayed by Choi Soo-jong and Baek Sung-hyun in the 2004-2005 KBS2 TV series Emperor of the Sea.
 On a 2022 episode of the TV series Finding Your Roots, it was revealed that one of American restauranteur and TV personality David Chang's paternal ancestors was Jang Bogo.

See also
 Yeom Jang
 Jang Bogo Station
 Cheonghaejin

References

External links
Jang Bogo - World History Encyclopedia 
Chang Po Go festival on Wando Island
ROK Navy profile of Jang Bogo
Jang BoGo Memorial Hall

Silla people
Silla Buddhists
Korean admirals
Korean generals
841 deaths
787 births
Deaths by stabbing